Thornton is a village within the metropolitan borough of the City of Bradford, in West Yorkshire, England.  It lies to the west of Bradford, and together with neighbouring Allerton, has total resident population of 15,004, increasing to 17,276 at the 2011 Census.  Its most famous residents were the Brontës.

The preserved centre of the village retains the character of a typical Pennine village, with stone built houses with stone flagged roofs.  The surrounding areas consist of more modern housing, still isolated from the rest of the city of Bradford by green fields.

Geography and administration 

Thornton derives from Old English and means a thorn tree at a farm or settlement. It was mentioned in the Domesday Book of the 11th century, when it had been laid waste by William the Conqueror's harrying of the North, punishment for an uprising against the Norman invaders of 1066.

Thornton was incorporated into the city of Bradford in 1899 and has been within the boundaries of the City of Bradford metropolitan borough since 1974, in which it comprises part of the Thornton and Allerton ward. It falls within the parliamentary constituency of Bradford West.

Its elevation, poor soils, isolation from major transport routes, and rainfall of over 34 inches a year limited farm production. Resources such as coal, iron and sandstone, the development of turnpike roads, and the coming of the railways enabled Thornton to share in the prosperity generated by the 19th-century wool worsted trade. The increasing use of steam-powered mills (at the expense of the former cottage-industry production methods) concentrated production in the valleys of the city centre. Foreign imports, the Second World War, and closure of the railways, all contributed to the decline in manufacturing. Today Thornton is a residential suburb of Bradford.

The main thoroughfare through the village is Market Street. This road was bypassed in 1826 by the new Thornton Road (the present day B6145) and as it was a very early bypass, most new building work has since taken place along Thornton Road. This has left Market Street largely untouched and it retains its original character and stonework on the buildings. This street forms the backbone of the conservation area in the village.

Notable residents 

Thornton's most famous residents were the Brontës. The Rev Patrick Brontë became the incumbent of Thornton Chapel in 1815, and Charlotte, Branwell, Emily and Anne Brontë were born at 74 Market Street, Thornton before the family moved to Haworth. The remains of the church where the father preached, known as the Bell Chapel, can be seen in the restored old graveyard off Thornton Road opposite the current church.

Thornton Viaduct

Thornton Viaduct was a railway viaduct for the Great Northern Railway line running from Queensbury to Keighley via Thornton. It was built in an S-shape to allow a smooth access to Thornton railway station. 
The viaduct is now a Grade II listed building.

The viaduct was reopened as part of The Great Northern Railway Trail between Cullingworth and Queensbury along the track bed in 2009, with a final link up to Queensbury opening in 2012.

See also
Beckfoot Thornton
Listed buildings in Thornton and Allerton, West Yorkshire

Notes

References

Sources

External links 

 Thornton Directory: community news and business directory.
 
 Thornton Viaduct.
 74, Market Street; Bronte birthplace
   All About Thornton, mainly in BD13 website

Geography of the City of Bradford
Villages in West Yorkshire